Pierre Viau (born January 29, 1952) is a Canadian former professional ice hockey defenceman.

During the 1972–73 season, Viau played four games in the World Hockey Association with the Chicago Cougars.

References

External links

1952 births
Living people
Canadian ice hockey defencemen
Chicago Cougars players
Cornwall Royals (QMJHL) players
Ice hockey people from Montreal
Johnstown Jets players
Long Island Ducks (ice hockey) players
Verdun Maple Leafs (ice hockey) players
Canadian expatriate ice hockey players in the United States